Kurt Browning,  (born June 18, 1966) is a Canadian figure skater, choreographer and commentator. He is the first skater to land a ratified quadruple jump in competition. He is a four-time World Champion and Canadian national champion.

Career 
Browning was both Canadian figure skating champion and World Champion four times. He represented Canada in three Winter Olympics, 1988 (finishing 8th overall), 1992 (6th) and 1994 (5th), and earned the privilege of carrying the Canadian flag during the opening ceremonies of the 1994 games in Lillehammer, Norway. Browning's other achievements include three Canadian Professional Championships and three World Professional Championships.

On March 25, 1988, at the 1988 World Championships in Budapest, Hungary, Browning landed the first ratified quadruple jump, a toe loop in the competition. This accomplishment is listed in the Guinness Book of Records. Jozef Sabovčík had previously landed a quad toe loop at the 1986 European Championships which was recognized at the event but then ruled invalid three weeks later. Browning later said, "I remember that there were a few people landing the jump (in practice) long before I did, and by watching them I was inspired to try it myself. After landing it, I certainly expected more skaters to start doing it in competition. I was surprised in the next few years when that really did not happen." Browning is also known for his intricate, fast, often lighthearted footwork.

One of Browning's iconic programs is "Singin' in the Rain", where he emulates Gene Kelly's dancing in the film. Choreographed by Sandra Bezic and debuted in a CBC-TV special in 1994, this program is still asked to be performed at ice shows after 20 years.

As a commentator, Browning has made frequent appearances since turning professional in 1994. He has been a regular colour commentator for the CBC at major skating events since 2006.

Browning appeared in the 2006 Fox television program Skating with Celebrities. Starting in 2009, he was the co-host of Battle of the Blades.

As a choreographer, he has choreographed programs for many figure skaters including:

 Jeremy Abbott
 Kevin Alves
 Patrick Chan
 Vaughn Chipeur
 Marc-André Craig
 Alissa Czisny
 Javier Fernández 
 Yuzuru Hanyu
 Takeshi Honda
 Brian Joubert
 Tuğba Karademir
 Carolina Kostner
 Takahiko Kozuka
 Tara Lipinski
 Evan Lysacek
 Brandon Mroz
 Lucinda Ruh
 Jamie Salé / David Pelletier
 Yuka Sato
 Tomáš Verner
 Yan Han

He also co-directed and choreographed the 2011–12 Stars on Ice tour.

Awards and honors 
Browning was awarded with a Lou Marsh Trophy for top Canadian Athlete (in 1990), Lionel Conacher Awards (1990 and 1991), Order of Canada (in 1990), an American Skating World Professional Skater of the Year Award (in 1998), and a Gustav Lussi Award from the Professional Skaters' Association (in 2001).

Browning was inducted into Canada's Sports Hall of Fame in 1994 and Skate Canada Hall of Fame in 2000. He was honored with a star on Canada's Walk of Fame in 2001. He was inducted into World Figure Skating Hall of Fame in 2006. He received the inaugural ISU Skating Lifetime Achievement Award in 2020.

Personal life 
Browning was born on June 18, 1966, in Rocky Mountain House, Alberta. He was raised in Caroline, Alberta. 

He married Sonia Rodriguez, a principal dancer with the National Ballet of Canada, on June 30, 1996. Their first son, Gabriel, was born on July 12, 2003, and their second son, Dillon, was born on August 14, 2007. They are now divorced.
 
Browning's home in the Forest Hill area of Toronto suffered a fire on August 18, 2010.

He married Alissa Czisny on August 11, 2022.

Competitive highlights

References

External links

 Kurt Files
 
 
 

1966 births
Sportspeople from Alberta
Canadian male single skaters
Lou Marsh Trophy winners
Olympic figure skaters of Canada
Figure skaters at the 1988 Winter Olympics
Figure skaters at the 1992 Winter Olympics
Figure skaters at the 1994 Winter Olympics
Living people
Members of the Order of Canada
People from Clearwater County, Alberta
Figure skating commentators
World Figure Skating Championships medalists
Canadian television hosts
Goodwill Games medalists in figure skating
Competitors at the 1990 Goodwill Games